The following lists events that happened during 1933 in the Republic of Paraguay.

Incumbents
President: Eusebio Ayala
Vice President: Raúl Casal-Ribeiro

Events
January 20–26 - First Battle of Nanawa
February - Battle of Campo Jordán
July 4–9 - Second Battle of Nanawa
August 30-September 15 - Battle of Campo Grande
November–December - Campo Vía pocket

Births

Deaths

See also
Chaco War

 
Years of the 20th century in Paraguay
1930s in Paraguay
Paraguay
Paraguay